K. Eileen Krupinski (née Bennett) is a Democratic politician who formerly served in the Ohio House of Representatives.  A native of Steubenville, Ohio, Krupinski's husband, Jerry W. Krupinski, served as a state representative for fourteen years, or seven terms.  However, when term limits barred him from running again in 2000, Eileen entered the race to succeed him. She won, and was seated on January 3, 2001 in the seat formerly held by her husband.

Up for reelection in 2002, Krupinski faced local weatherman John Domenick in a primary race for the Democratic nomination.  Fairly popular, Domenick proved to be a strong contender, and ultimately defeated Krupinski to go on to the general election. As a result, Krupinski served only two years in office as state representative.

Following elected office, Krupinski became greatly involved with the Ohio Federation of Women's Clubs and the Federated Democratic Women of Ohio.  She also served as a delegate to Ohio's 6th Congressional District in 2008.

References

External links
The Ohio Ladies' Gallery: Rep. Eileen Krupinski

Democratic Party members of the Ohio House of Representatives
Women state legislators in Ohio
Living people
Year of birth missing (living people)
21st-century American politicians
21st-century American women politicians